= Theatre Fest =

The Theatre Fest is a festival that takes place every April in the Macedonian National Theatre in Skopje, North Macedonia. It hosts Macedonian and foreign theatres and lasts five days.
